The 2020 Notre Dame Fighting Irish football team represented the University of Notre Dame in the 2020 NCAA Division I FBS football season. The team was led by Brian Kelly in his 11th season at Notre Dame. The Fighting Irish played their home games at Notre Dame Stadium in South Bend, Indiana.

Because the Power Five conferences enforced restrictions on non-conference games in light of the COVID-19 pandemic, Notre Dame played a full Atlantic Coast Conference (ACC) schedule for the 2020 season (expanding upon an existing relationship in all other sports besides football and ice hockey).  This was the first season in several decades that Notre Dame did not play its traditional intersectional rivalry games against Navy (previously played every season since 1927), USC (since 1946), or Stanford (since 1997).

After the cancellation of the Wake Forest game scheduled for December 12 by the ACC, due to an evaluation of the three teams in contention to play in the ACC Championship Game, Notre Dame clinched a spot in the ACC Championship Game, which they went on to lose to Clemson.

The Fighting Irish were subsequently ranked fourth in the final College Football Playoff (CFP) rankings, securing a spot in the Rose Bowl, a CFP semifinal game, against top–ranked Alabama. Notre Dame lost to Alabama on New Year's Day, the eventual national champion, ending the season with a 10–2 record.

Previous season
The 2019 Notre Dame Fighting Irish football team finished 11–2 on the season with a 33–9 victory over Iowa State in the Camping World Bowl in Orlando, Florida. They finished at No. 12 in the final AP Poll of the 2019 season.

Coaching changes
Chip Long, former offensive coordinator of the Fighting Irish, was relieved of his duties by Notre Dame and became an offensive analyst at University of Tennessee.

Offseason

Departures
NFL
 TE Cole Kmet (drafted by the Chicago Bears)
 WR Chase Claypool (drafted by the Pittsburgh Steelers)
 LB Julian Okwara (drafted by the Detroit Lions)
 CB Troy Pride (drafted by the Carolina Panthers)
 LB Khalid Kareem (drafted by the Cincinnati Bengals)
 S Alohi Gilman (drafted by the Los Angeles Chargers)
 LB Asmar Bilal (signed by the Los Angeles Chargers)
 S Jalen Elliott (signed by the Detroit Lions)
 WR Chris Finke (signed by the San Francisco 49ers)
 LB Jamir Jones (signed by the Houston Texans)
 RB Tony Jones Jr. (signed by the New Orleans Saints)
 CB Donte' Vaughn (signed by the Los Angeles Chargers)

Transfers out
 CB Temitope Agoro (transferred to Duquesne)
 LB Jonathan Jones (transferred to Toledo)
 QB Phil Jurkovec (transferred to Boston College)
 OL John Olmstead (transferred to Lafayette)
 WR/DB Isaiah Robertson (entered transfer portal)
 WR Michael Young Jr. (transferred to Cincinnati)

Other
 OL Cole Mabry (medically retired from football)

Transfers in
 K Dawson Goepferich (transferred from Brown)
 CB Nick McCloud (transferred from NC State)
 S Isaiah Pryor (transferred from Ohio State)
 WR Ben Skowronek (transferred from Northwestern)

Schedule
The 2020 schedule was officially released on December 7, 2017.

Due to suspensions of athletic programs nationwide as a result of the COVID-19 pandemic, the team called off the 2020 edition of its spring Blue-Gold Game. The Emerald Isle Classic game against Navy at Aviva Stadium in Dublin, Ireland  was tentatively rescheduled for Navy–Marine Corps Memorial Stadium in Annapolis, Maryland, and three games were scrapped after the Big Ten and Pac-12 elected to restrict play to conference opponents only. This included a game scheduled against Wisconsin on October 3 (which was to be played at Lambeau Field in Green Bay as a Shamrock Series game), the team's rivalry game against Stanford, and the team's rivalry game against USC (resulting in its postponement for the first time since World War II).

In regards to replacing the canceled games, head coach Brian Kelly told ESPN's Mike Greenberg that "our phone is ringing off the hook right now in terms of teams looking for games", and that Notre Dame athletics director Jack Swarbrick had been communicating with ACC commissioner John Swofford; as per its membership in most other sports, Notre Dame typically plays five games against ACC opponents per-season. On July 29, 2020, the ACC officially announced that Notre Dame would play its 2020 season within the conference, with 10 games against ACC opponents, a non-conference game of its choice played in-state, and being eligible to compete for the conference championship. The team contributed revenue from its broadcast rights with NBC into the conference's shared pool, split between all ACC members and Notre Dame.

Notre Dame's opening game against Duke marked the first time that the Fighting Irish had ever competed in, or won a conference game.

Original

Revised

Rankings

Personnel

Game summaries

Duke

South Florida

Florida State

Louisville

at Pittsburgh

at Georgia Tech

Clemson

at Boston College

at North Carolina

Syracuse

at Wake Forest (No Contest)

The No. 2 Notre Dame at Wake Forest game was canceled by the ACC, due to an evaluation of the three teams in contention to play in the ACC Championship Game and the game was not rescheduled. Instead, Notre Dame ended their regular season vs. Syracuse and had a bye this week, and Wake Forest played a replacement game at Louisville.

vs. Clemson (ACC Championship)

vs. Alabama (Rose Bowl)

Players drafted into the NFL

References

Notre Dame
Notre Dame Fighting Irish football seasons
Notre Dame Fighting Irish football